Deinotheriidae ("terrible beasts") is a family of prehistoric elephant-like proboscideans that lived during the Cenozoic era, first appearing in Africa, then spreading across southern Asia (Indo-Pakistan) and Europe.  During that time, they changed very little, apart from growing much larger in size; by the late Miocene, they had become the largest land animals of their time.  Their most distinctive features were the downward-curving tusks on the lower jaw.

Deinotheres were not very diverse; the only three known genera are Chilgatherium, Prodeinotherium, and Deinotherium.  These form an evolutionary succession, with each new genus replacing the preceding one. Unlike the various mammoth and mastodont lineages, the deinotheres died out in the early Pleistocene, rather than continuing through the ice age.

Description
The body shape and proportions of deinotheres were very much like those of modern elephants.  The legs were long, like modern elephants, but the skull was rather flatter than that of true elephants.  The upper jaw lacked incisor and canine teeth, but possessed five low-crowned molars on each side, with the same number in the lower jaw.  Deinotheres used their front teeth for crushing their food, and the back teeth for shearing (slicing) the plant material. The front part of the lower jaw was turned downwards, and bore the two tusk-like incisors.  These curved downwards and backwards in a sort of huge hook, and constituted the most distinct feature of the deinotheres. The tusks were used to strip vegetation rather than for digging.

Ecology
Deinotheres were "shearing browsers" adapted for feeding on plants above ground level. The way they chewed their food was probably similar to that of modern tapirs, with the front teeth being used to crush the food, while the second and third molars have a strong vertical shearing action, with little lateral (side-to-side) movement.  This chewing action differs from both that of gomphotheres (lateral grinding) and elephants (horizontal shearing). Deinothere molars show little wear, indicating a diet of soft, nongritty, forest vegetation, with the down-turned lower tusks being used for stripping bark or other vegetation.

Deinotherium giganteum has a more elongated lower fore limb than early and middle Miocene Prodeinotherium, indicating a more efficient stride as an adaptation to the spread of savannas in Europe during the late Miocene.  Deinotheres probably migrated from forest to forest, traversing the wide and (to them) useless grasslands.

Evolutionary history 

The ancestry and evolutionary relationships of the deinotheres remain obscure.  They are thought to be related to the barytheres, due to similarities in the structure of the teeth.  They clearly diverged from the rest of the proboscideans at a very early date.  In the 1970s, several researchers placed them in a separate order to the Proboscidea, but this view is not followed nowadays.

The oldest known deinothere is Chilgatherium harrisi from the late Oligocene.  Its fossil remains have been found in the district of Chilga in Ethiopia (hence the name).  This indicates that, like other proboscideans, deinotheres evolved in Africa.  Chilgatherium was quite small, about midway between a large pig and a small hippopotamus in size.

By the early Miocene, deinotheres had grown to the size of a small elephant, and had migrated to Eurasia.  Several species are known, all belonging to the genus Prodeinotherium.

During the late middle Miocene, these modest-seized proboscideans were replaced by much larger forms across Eurasia.  In Europe, Prodeinotherium bavaricum appeared in the early Miocene mammal faunal zone MN 4, but was soon replaced by Deinotherium giganteum in the middle Miocene.  Likewise in Asia, Prodeinotherium is known from the early Miocene strata in the Bugti Hills, and continued into the middle Miocene Chinji Formation, where it was replaced by D. indicum.

While these Miocene deinotheres were dispersed widely and evolved to huge elephant size, they were not as common as the contemporary (but smaller) Elephantoidea.  Fossil remains of this age are known from the France, Germany, Greece, Malta, and northern India and Pakistan. These consist chiefly of teeth and the bones of the skull.

After the extinction of the paraceratheres at the end of the early Miocene, the deinotheres were (and remained) the largest animals walking the Earth.

The late Miocene was the heyday of the giant deinotheres.  D. giganteum was common from Vallesian and Turolian localities in Europe.  Prodeinotherium, which was reasonably well represented in the early Miocene of Africa, was succeeded by D. bozasi at the beginning of the late Miocene.  And in Asia, D. indicum was most common in the late-Miocene Dhok Pathan Formation.

Fossil teeth of D. giganteum, from the late-Miocene Sinap Formation at the Turkish site of Kayadibi are larger than those from older localities, such as Eppelsheim, Wissberg, and Montredon, indicating a tendency for increasing size of members of the species over time.  These were the biggest animals of their day, protected from both predators and rival herbivores by virtue of their huge bulk. The largest mammoths did not approach them in size until the Pleistocene.

With the end of the Miocene, deinothere fortunes declined.  D. indicum died out about 7 million years ago, possibly driven to extinction by the same process of climate change that had previously eliminated the even more enormous Paraceratherium.  While in Europe, D. giganteum continued, albeit with dwindling numbers, until the middle Pliocene; the most recent specimen is from Romania.

In its original African homeland, Deinotherium continued to flourish throughout the Pliocene, and fossils have been uncovered at several of the African sites where remains of hominids have also been found.

The last deinothere species to become extinct was D. bozasi.  The youngest known specimens are from the Kanjera Formation, Kenya, about 1 million years ago (early Pleistocene).  The causes of the extinction of such a successful and long-lived animal are not known, although a small number of other species of African megafauna also died out at this time.

References

Further reading
 
 
 
 
 
 
  
 "Dinotherium", 1911 Encyclopædia Britannica

Deinotheriids
Chattian first appearances
Pleistocene extinctions
Taxa named by Charles Lucien Bonaparte
Prehistoric mammal families

de:Deinotherien
it:Deinotheriidae